Svartfjellet may refer to several mountains in Norway:

Svartfjellet (Kvaløya), a mountain in Kvalsund municipality, Finnmark county
Svartfjellet (Kvænangen), a mountain in Kvænangen municipality, Troms county
Svartfjellet (Lenvik), a mountain in Lenvik municipality, Troms county
Svartfjellet (Loppa), a mountain in Loppa municipality, Finnmark county
Svartfjellet (Norddal), a mountain in Norddal municipality, Møre og Romsdal county
Svartfjellet (Nordreisa), a mountain in Nordreisa municipality, Troms county
Svartfjellet (Rendalen), a mountain in Rendalen municipality, Hedmark county